Generator may refer to:
 Signal generator, electronic devices that generate repeating or non-repeating electronic signals
 Electric generator, a device that converts mechanical energy to electrical energy.
 Generator (circuit theory), an element in an abstract circuit providing a source of electricity
 Engine-generator, an electric generator with its own engine
 Wearable generator, a hypothetical generator that can be worn on the human body
 Gas generator a device, often similar to a solid rocket or a liquid rocket that burns to produce large volumes of relatively cool gas
 Motor–generator, a device for converting electrical power to another form
 Atmospheric water generator, a device capable of extracting water from air

Mathematics 
 Generator (mathematics)
 Generator matrix, a matrix used in coding theory
 Generator (category theory) of a category, in category mathematics
 Generating set of a group, group generators in abstract algebra
 Infinitesimal generator (stochastic processes), in stochastic analysis

Computing 
 Application generator, software that generates application programs from descriptions of the problem rather than by traditional programming
 Generator (computer programming), a routine that acts like an iterator
 Pseudorandom number generator, a producer of random numbers
 Code generator, part of a compiler
 Natural-language generator, generating natural language from a machine representation system such as a knowledge base or a logical form
 Random test generator, used in software testing

Music 
 The Generators, a 1997 punk rock band from Los Angeles
 Kix (band), an American glam metal band also known as The Generators
 Generator (Bad Religion album), and the album's opening track
 Generator (Aborym album), the fourth studio album by the Italian/Norwegian industrial black metal band Aborym
 "Generator" (Foo Fighters song), 2000
 "Generator" (The Holloways song), 2006
 "Generator", a 2015 song by Doomtree from All Hands
 "Generator", a 1995 song by Elastica from The Menace
 "Generator", a 2007 song by Minipop from A New Hope
 "Generator", a 2017 song by Turnstile from Time & Space

 Tuning generator

Politics
 Generator Collective, American campaign group

See also 
 Gener8tor, an American venture capital firm
 Generation (disambiguation)
 Generate (disambiguation)
 Regenerative heat exchanger